Pseudorinympha is a genus of moths of the family Yponomeutidae.

Species
Pseudorinympha laeta - Clarke, 1971 

Yponomeutidae